Gopinathpur is a small village in Golanthara, Ganjam district, Odisha, India.  the 2011 Census of India, it had a population of 396 across 86 households.

References 

Villages in Ganjam district